Larry Sangma (born 5 October 1992) is an Indian cricketer. He made his Twenty20 debut for Meghalaya in the 2018–19 Syed Mushtaq Ali Trophy on 27 February 2019. He made his List A debut on 11 October 2019, for Meghalaya in the 2019–20 Vijay Hazare Trophy. He made his first-class debut on 17 February 2022, for Meghalaya in the 2021–22 Ranji Trophy.

References

External links
 

1992 births
Living people
Indian cricketers
Meghalaya cricketers
Place of birth missing (living people)